The Very Best of Tommy Emmanuel is a greatest hits double album by Australian guitarist, Tommy Emmanuel, which was released in August 2001. It peaked at number 22 on the ARIA Albums Chart and number 3 on the component, ARIA Australasian Artists Albums chart. One CD has Emmanuel using electric guitar, while on the other he used acoustic guitar.

Track listing

Charts

References

Tommy Emmanuel albums
2001 greatest hits albums
Columbia Records albums
Compilation albums by Australian artists